Madray Johnson (born July 16, 2007) is an American artistic gymnast.  She is the 2021 Junior Pan American Games champion on uneven bars and balance beam and is the 2022 U.S. junior national champion.

Gymnastics career

Junior

2021 
In February, Johnson competed at the WOGA Classic where she placed second. She next competed at the 2021 Winter Cup where she placed third in the all-around and third on balance beam. She next competed at the American Classic where she placed third in the all-around and won bronze on uneven bars. She also competed at the 2021 U.S. Classic where she finished seventh on balance beam and seventeenth in the all-around.

In June, she competed at the competed at her first National Championships. She ended the two day competition second in the all-around with a combined score of 105.150. Additionally she won silver on uneven bars and bronze on balance beam, and finished in sixth place on vault and floor. As a result, she was named to the United States women's national team for the first time. She next competed at the 2021 Junior Pan American Championships, where she helped the United States finish first in the team final. Individually she won gold on balance beam, and silver on uneven bars and in the all-around. 

In November, she was selected to represent the United States at the inaugural Junior Pan American Games alongside Kailin Chio, Katelyn Jong and Tiana Sumanasekera.  While there she helped the United States place first as a team and individually she won gold on uneven bars and balance beam.

2022 
In February, Johnson competed at the WOGA Classic where she placed first. She then competed at the 2022 Winter Cup where she finished fourth on vault, and balance beam, and sixth in the all-around.

In April, she competed at the 2022 City of Jesolo Trophy alongside Myli Lew, Ella Murphy, Zoey Molomo, Gabby Van Frayen, and Tiana Sumanasekera. They won the team event and Johnson won silver in the all-around competition. During the event finals she also won an additional two silver medals on uneven bars and balance beam.

Competitive history

References

External links
 
 

2007 births
Living people
American female artistic gymnasts
U.S. women's national team gymnasts
People from Dallas
21st-century American women